The Changjiao massacre was a massacre of Chinese civilians by the China Expeditionary Army in Changjiao, Hunan. Gen. Shunroku Hata was the commander of the Japanese forces. For four days, from May 9-12, 1943, more than 30,000 civilians were killed.

See also
List of massacres in China
Japanese war crimes
Nanking massacre
Battle of West Hubei

References

External links
Xinhuanet.com article on Changjiao Massacre (in Simplified Chinese) 厂窖惨案一天屠杀一万人
People.com article (in Simplied Chinese) 骇人听闻的厂窖惨案

Massacres committed by Japan
Massacres in China
Second Sino-Japanese War crimes
World War II massacres
History of Hunan
May 1943 events
1943 murders in China
Massacres in 1943